GTP cyclohydrolases are enzymes that catalyze imidazole ring opening of guanosine triphosphate (GTP). This reaction is the committed step in the biosynthesis of multiple coenzymes (such as riboflavin and folate), tRNA bases, and the phytotoxin toxoflavin. Several GTP cyclohydrolases exist, which sometimes synthesize different products for different pruposes:

 GTP cyclohydrolase I, part of the tetrahydrobiopterin, tetrahydrofolate, queuosine and other biosynthetic pathways
 GTP cyclohydrolase Ia, 
 GTP cyclohydrolase Ib, part of the tetrahydrobiopterin, tetrahydrofolate, queueosine and other biosynthetic pathways
 GTP cyclohydrolase II, part of the riboflavin and toxoflavin biosynthetic pathways
 GTP cyclohydrolase IIa (or GTP cyclohydrolase III), part of the riboflavin and deazaflavin cofactor biosynthetic pathways
 GTP cyclohydrolase IV
 GTP cyclohydrolase MptA, GTP cyclohydrolase Ib paralog

These enzymes require divalent cations for catalysis.

References 

EC 3.5.4
Hydrolases